Carol Connors may refer to:

 Carol Connors (actress) (born 1952), American erotic actress
 Carol Connors (singer) (born 1940), American singer-songwriter